Samuel Holmes may refer to:

Samuel Jackson Holmes, zoologist and eugenicist
Sam Holmes, baseball player
Samuel Holmes (Illinois politician)